How the West Was Fun is a 1994 Revisionist western film starring Mary-Kate and Ashley Olsen.

Synopsis
8-year-old twin girls Jessica and Susie Martin (Mary-Kate and Ashley Olsen) live with their father, Stephen (Patrick Cassidy), in Philadelphia. They have a dream about a man saying, "This town ain't big enough for the three of us" and having a shootout but argue who makes their move first. One day, they receive a letter from their late mother Sarah's godmother, Natty (Phillips), inviting them to a dude ranch. She, not knowing about Sarah's death, wants her to come help at the ranch. She is having financial problems because the ranch has too few paying visitors and, although she has offers, she does not want to sell it. The girls try to ask their dad's uptight boss, "The Dragon Lady" (Ms. Plaskett), for his vacation time, only to get him fired. They lie and say that she said that they could go. They go to the ranch and attempt to help Natty.

As they arrive they meet George Tailfeathers (Cardinal), Natty's friendly but mysterious Native American ranch foreman, and they become fast friends. But Natty's dim-witted son, Bart Gifooley (Mull), immediately condescends to and patronizes the girls. Sarah's horse, Lightning, leads them to her secret hideout. They find half of a stone owl and bear, plus her diary which tells how Bart had once tried to set fire to the ranch, and about his secret hideout in a place called "The Bear's Mouth". As they finish reading, they see smoke and start running towards it, thinking it is another fire, but find it is Bart burning papers. They lie to him that an ember landed on the roof so they can find out what they are. They find out that he has been turning people away from the ranch. Trying to take a letter to Natty to show what he is doing, they are chased by him. He tears up the letter and snarls, "This ranch ain't big enough for the three of us", which brings the girls to a conclusion that he was the one in the dream.

Right before Bart can do any more, George backs them up with a riding lesson. At lunch, despite Bart's orders not to, they convince Natty to fix up the ranch and open it again. Later, Bart finds out that Stephen was fired and is about to tell him the truth, but instead decides to give the girls a chance to tell it themselves. Despite Natty's offers, he turns down her job offerings. Later, the girls find a hidden trap door under a stuffed bear (The Bear's Mouth), go inside, and find out that Bart is selling the ranch to make it into Gifooley Land Theme Park. Before Natty is about to sign the deed to the ranch to him, the girls convince her what he is plotting. Heartbroken, she orders him off her land, or else he would "get a good spanking".

Meanwhile, Stephen tries to get a loan but is turned down. What he does not know is that the bank is already with Bart on the whole deal. That night, the girls ride off to Denver to convince Leo McRugger, the businessman to whom Bart is selling the ranch, to not go through with the deal. Their offers are so interesting, McRugger and his executives decide to come down for a week just to see if it is actually what they are talking about. It is fixed up with the help of George, Stephen, Natty, the girls, and Laura Forrester (Greene), Steven's girlfriend. The activities are set up. However, each is sabotaged by Bart. Just when all appears to be lost, the girls decide to find a lost treasure since they have a map. But first, they trap Bart so he cannot do any more damage. They and everyone else find the gold, which turns out to be fool's gold, but still pleases McRugger and his executives. He agrees to spare the ranch.

As they head to the river, they are confronted by Bart. He tries to escape in a raft. The girls go after him only to be grabbed by him and taken down the river, after kicking his friend, Cookie in the water. He heads them down rapids and then realizes that they are headed for a dam. Down the river, the girls see a rope hanging off a bridge. They grab it and hang on. Bart plunges down the dam and gets severely injured as a result. The girls write their own diary. The movie ends with 
Everyone dancing at the ranch minus Bart who is sitting down

Cast
Ashley Olsen ... Jessica Martin 
Mary-Kate Olsen ... Susie Martin 
Elizabeth Olsen ... Girl In Car
Martin Mull ... Bart Gifooley 
Michele Greene ... Laura Forrester 
Patrick Cassidy ... Stephen Martin 
Ben Cardinal ... George Tailfeathers 
Leon Pownall ... Leo McRugger 
Peg Phillips ... Natty 
Wes Tritter ... Cookie 
Georgie Collins ... Mrs. Plaskett
Heather Lea MacCallum ... Leona 
Shaun Johnston ... Phil 
Daniel Libman ... Roger
Bartley Bard ... Mr. Sutton

Production 

The film was filmed in the Canadian Rockies, one hour west of Calgary, Alberta at Rafter Six Ranch Resort. Shots in the city were done within Calgary, including a ride on Calgary Transit's C-Train.

Trivia 
The title "How the West Was Fun" is a reference to the 1962 ensemble Western film How the West Was Won.

References

External links 
 

1994 television films
1994 films
American television films
Warner Bros. films
Films about twin sisters
ABC Motion Pictures films
Twins in fiction
1990s English-language films
Films directed by Stuart Margolin